"Only One Road" is a song by Canadian singer Celine Dion, taken from her third English-language studio album, The Colour of My Love (1993). It was written by Peter Zizzo and produced by Ric Wake. "Only One Road" was released as the fourth single from the album in October 1994 in North America, in May 1995 in the United Kingdom and Australia, and in July 1995 in selected European countries. The black and white music video for the song, directed by Greg Masuak, was released in 1995. "Only One Road" topped the Canadian Adult Contemporary Chart and reached top ten in the United Kingdom and Ireland, peaking at number eight in both countries. It was later included on Dion's greatest hits albums, The Collector's Series, Volume One (2000) and My Love: Ultimate Essential Collection (2008).

Critical reception
Larry Flick from Billboard described "Only One Road" as "another glistening pop ballad" from Dion's "memorable" album, The Colour of My Love. He added that "her flawless soprano range flexes admirably within this infectious and appropriately dramatic composition. It is difficult to imagine any pop or AC programmer with a penchant for gooey romance not putting this on the air instantly. Just lovely". Pip Ellwood-Hughes from Entertainment Focus said it is "one of the album's finest moments. It's a classic ballad that features one of the best vocals on the record. The power, strength and control she has over her voice is astounding and she makes hitting all those notes sound effortless". Dennis Hunt from LA Times compared Dion to singers like Mariah Carey and Whitney Houston, noting "that grandiose, note-stretching finish" on the song. 

Pan-European magazine Music & Media commented, "Think twice before you drop this one. But it's fair to say now that La Dion has become the 1990's Streisand, for whom singing big ballads was like brushing her teeth". A reviewer from Music Week gave it three out of five, writing, "How do you follow Think Twice? With another show-stopping ballad, of course". The reviewer concluded with that it "keeps up the Canadian songbird's profile and should whizz off those racks". Annika Heinle from The Stanford Daily called it a "tearjerker", adding that "it's all about memories, standing tall and Celine Dion's diva stage moves". Christopher Smith from TalkAboutPopMusic described it as a "more restrained number, slower paced and more soulful", stating that it gives the singer "the chance to stretch her lungs over each and every chorus".

Track listing and formats

European CD / UK cassette single
"Only One Road" – 4:48
"Calling You" (Live at the Olympia, Paris) – 4:04

US cassette single
"Only One Road" – 4:48
"The Power of Love" (Live) – 4:36

Australian CD and cassette / European and UK CD maxi-single
"Only One Road" – 4:48
"L'amour existe encore" – 3:50
"Calling You" (Live at the Olympia, Paris) – 4:04

European and UK CD maxi-single (Remixes)
"Only One Road" – 4:48
"Misled" (MK Mix) – 6:41
"Love Can Move Mountains" (Club Mix) – 5:30
"Misled" (MK Dub Mix) – 7:57

UK promotional CD single
"Only One Road" (Radio Edit) – 3:50
"Only One Road" (Breakfast Edit) – 3:00

US promotional CD single
"Only One Road" (Humberto Gatica Mix) – 4:48

Charts

Weekly charts

Year-end charts

Release history

See also
List of UK top-ten singles in 1995

References

External links

1993 songs
1994 singles
1995 singles
1990s ballads
Celine Dion songs
Black-and-white music videos
Songs written by Peter Zizzo
Pop ballads
Song recordings produced by Ric Wake